The women's 3 × 5 kilometre relay cross-country skiing event was part of the cross-country skiing programme at the 1960 Winter Olympics, in Squaw Valley, California, United States. It was the second appearance of the event. The competition was held on Friday, February 26, 1960, at the McKinney Creek Stadium.

Sweden surprisingly won the gold medal ahead of the Soviet Union who took the first four places in the individual event. Bulgaria were due to have a team, but they did not start the race.

Results

References
1960 Squaw Valley Official Olympic Report
sports-reference
Sport Statistics - International Competitions Archive

Women's cross-country skiing at the 1960 Winter Olympics
Women's 4 × 5 kilometre relay cross-country skiing at the Winter Olympics
Oly
Cross